Skynet 5B is a military communications satellite operated by Astrium Services, formerly Paradigm Secure Communications, on behalf of the British Ministry of Defence. It was the second of four Skynet 5 satellites to be launched.

Spacecraft
The Skynet 5B spacecraft is a Eurostar 3000S satellite, constructed by Astrium. Its  solar arrays will generate a minimum of 6 kilowatts to power its UHF and X-band communications systems.

The Skynet 5 constellation was originally intended to consist of two satellites, the other of which, Skynet 5A, was launched earlier in 2007. By the time of Skynet 5B's launch, a decision had been made to launch the backup spacecraft, Skynet 5C, as an on-orbit spare; this was launched in 2008. Skynet 5D was ordered to replace the backup, however this too was launched in 2012. Skynet 5 replaced the earlier Skynet 4 system.

Launch
Skynet 5B was launched by an Ariane 5ECA carrier rocket flying from ELA-3 at Kourou. The launch occurred at 22:06 UTC on 14 November 2007. Star One C1 was launched aboard the same carrier rocket; Skynet 5B was mounted atop a Sylda 5 adaptor, with Star One C1 attached to the upper stage underneath the Sylda. Skynet 5B was the first of the two spacecraft to separate from the carrier rocket.

Orbit 
The launch placed Skynet 5B into a  geosynchronous transfer orbit with 6 degrees of inclination. The satellite used its apogee motor to raise itself into geostationary orbit.

References

Spacecraft launched in 2007
Military satellites
Satellites of the United Kingdom
Satellites using the Eurostar bus
Spacecraft launched by Ariane rockets